Rosengarten is a rural municipality in the district of Harburg, Lower Saxony, Germany, close to Hamburg. It has a population of 13,242 (2004). It was formed in 1972 as a combination of the villages of Eckel, Ehestorf (with Alvesen), Emsen, Iddensen, Klecken, Leversen, Nenndorf, Sottorf, Tötensen, and Vahrendorf, and was named for a nearby forest of the same name.

Established in 1990, the Honorary Consulate of the Republic of Guinea to Hamburg is located in Rosengarten.

The village Tötensen is well known in Germany as the residence of Dieter Bohlen.

Notes

External links
 

Harburg (district)